Maledetto il giorno che t'ho incontrato (Damned the Day I Met You) is a 1992 Italian romantic comedy film directed by Carlo Verdone. The film won five David di Donatello Awards, for best screenplay, best actor, best cinematography, best editing and best supporting actress (Elisabetta Pozzi). For her performance Margherita Buy won the Ciak d'oro for best actress.

Plot 
Bernardo, a Roman music journalist living in Milan, is dumped by his girlfriend (almost fiancé), and, extremely depressed, begins working with a therapist, Prof. Altieri. His career as a rock music critic begins to decline, and he cannot find a way to publish a book on the life secrets of Jimi Hendrix. In the meantime, he meets the neurotic Camilla, who is both a patient and a wannabe lover of Altieri's, with whom she's obsessed. From that point on, Camilla disrupts Bernardo's life, but becomes his best friend. After a huge fight, the two lose contact. They separately travel to London, where Camilla is a theatre actress and Bernardo is working on Hendrix's biography, interviewing people who might have known the rock star. They meet again, apologizing to one another, only to have their personal and professional lives disrupted again. One night, at Land's End in Cornwall, Bernardo and Camilla get intimately close, enraging Camilla's latest boyfriend (her theatre production's director), with whom she was not happy anyway. Camilla secretly sells a precious ring to fund Bernardo's interview with an important source for his book. Later on though, she messes up the recording of the interview... The ending is very romantic, unlike the ending of most of Verdone's movies.

Cast 
Carlo Verdone as Bernardo Arbusti
Margherita Buy as Camilla Landolfi
Elisabetta Pozzi as Adriana
Giancarlo Dettori as Attilio De Sorges
Stefania Casini as Clari
Renato Pareti as Loris 
Dario Casalini as Flavio
Alexis Meneloff as Professor Ludwig Altieri
Count Prince Miller as Catfish
Didi Perego as Camilla's mother
Valeria Sabel as Bernardo's mother
Ernesto Martini as Bernardo's father
Richard Benson as himself

Reception
In its second week of release, the film reached number one at the Italian box office and remained there for two weeks. It was the fourth highest-grossing Italian film in Italy for the year with a gross of $6.4 million and the eleventh overall.

Awards

References

External links

Maledetto il giorno che t'ho incontrato at Variety Distribution

1992 films
Italian romantic comedy films
Films directed by Carlo Verdone
1992 romantic comedy films
Films set in Milan
Films set in London
Films set in Cornwall
1990s Italian-language films
1990s Italian films